In the Drink may refer to:

In the Drink, a 1999 novel by Kate Christensen
"In the Drink", song by the Barenaked Ladies from Born on a Pirate Ship
In the Drink, a solo album by Justin Pierre